Women Who Play is a 1932 British comedy film directed by Arthur Rosson and starring Mary Newcomb, Benita Hume and George Barraud. It was produced by Walter Morosco and Alexander Korda and has a screenplay by Basil Mason and Gilbert Wakefield. It is based on the 1925 play Spring Cleaning by Frederick Lonsdale.

Premise
In order to deter his wife from having an affair a man hires an actress as part of an elaborate scheme.

Cast
 Mary Newcomb as Mona
 Benita Hume as Margaret Sones
 George Barraud as Richard Sones
 Joan Barry as Fay
 Barry Jones as Ernest Steele
 Edmund Breon as Rachie Wells
 Gerald Lyle as Bobby
 Sylvia Leslie as Lady Jane
 Evan Thomas as Willie

Production
Women Who Play was filmed at British and Dominion Studios, Elstree, in Hertfordshire, England for Paramount British Pictures.

See also
 The Fast Set (1924)

References

External links

1932 films
1932 comedy films
Films directed by Arthur Rosson
British films based on plays
British comedy films
British black-and-white films
British remakes of American films
Sound film remakes of silent films
Films shot at Imperial Studios, Elstree
1930s English-language films
1930s British films